Churapcha (Çurapçı) is a rural locality (a selo) and the administrative center of Churapchinsky District in the Sakha Republic, Russia. Population:

Geography
Churapcha is located by the lake of the same name, which drains to the left of the Tatta River, a tributary of the Aldan flowing a few kilometers to the southeast.

History
It was founded in 1725 after opening the road (trakt) from Yakutsk to Okhotsk, which was supposed to allow post and trade to reach the Sea of Okhotsk. The road passed through very rough and isolated terrain and was never fully operational, eventually being officially closed in 1852. In 1930, Churapcha became the administrative center of Churapchinsky District and soon thereafter was connected by road to the outside world through the construction of the Kolyma Highway.

Transportation
The Kolyma Highway from Yakutsk to Magadan runs through Churapcha.

Climate
Churapcha has an extremely continental subarctic climate (Köppen climate classification: Dfd), with average winter temperatures even colder than nearby, more northerly Yakutsk. The summers are very warm and on average maybe warmest for Dfd/Dwd/Dsd climates. Churapcha is one of the very few places on earth where difference between average summer and winter temperature exceeds 60° C. 

Precipitation is significantly lower in the winter.

References

Rural localities in Churapchinsky District